Odile Madeline Gertze (born c. 1988) is a former Namibian beauty queen from Windhoek.  She was crowned Miss Namibia 2010 on July 31, 2010 and became one of the top 25 semifinalists in Miss World 2010.

Early life
Gertze graduated from Elizabeth Galloway Fashion Academy in 2009, in South Africa, and while she was there, she took the opportunity to gain experience while working as a model during her studies.

She is currently working as a freelance journalist for The Namibian for their fashion section in The Weekender and previously worked on model work, such as Photography for Print Media, Model portfolio, Ramp/fashion shows, Meet & greet, Promotions and Fashion Shows.

Miss World 2010
As the official representative of her country to the 2010 Miss World pageant held in Sanya, China, Gertze became one of the Top 20 finalists during the Miss World Talent fast track event held on October 26, finishing her participation as one of the Top 25 semifinalists of Miss World 2010 on October 30.

References

External links 
 Official Miss Namibia website

1980s births
Living people
Miss World 2010 delegates
Date of birth missing (living people)
People from Windhoek
Namibian beauty pageant winners